Cole Marsden Greif-Neill, known professionally as Cole M.G.N., is an American musician, record producer, songwriter and mixer. He is a former member of Ariel Pink's Haunted Graffiti. Cole has worked with Beck, Julia Holter, Christine and the Queens, DāM-FunK, Ariel Pink, Real Estate, The Vaccines, Thurston Moore, Snoop Dogg, NxWorries, Kossisko, Charlotte Gainsbourg, Blood Orange and Nite Jewel. In 2016, Cole M.G.N. released his self-titled debut extended play.

As of 2021, he has won six Grammy Awards for his work with Beck.

Biography
He graduated from New York University's Tisch School of the Arts in 2007. In January 2006, he married Ramona Gonzalez of Nite Jewel. The couple split in 2018 after twelve years of marriage.

Career
He was a member of Ariel Pink's Haunted Graffiti before becoming Beck's engineer and his current work with Stones Throw. In recent years he has been involved in producing and mixing on records for the likes of Julia Holter, Ariel Pink's Haunted Graffiti and Snoop Dogg, and Dam-Funk's collaborative project, 7 Days Of Funk.

He won three Grammy Awards for his work on Beck's 2014 album Morning Phase, two Grammy Awards for his work on Beck's 2018 album Colors and one Grammy Award for his work on Beck's 2019 album Hyperspace.

Cole is managed by Chelsea Avery, Lucas Keller and Nic Warner at Milk & Honey Music, and published by Kobalt Music Group for the world.

Discography

EPs
 Cole M.G.N. (2016)

Singles
 "If U Let Me" (2016)

Credits

Albums

EPs

Singles

References

American electronic musicians
Living people
Tisch School of the Arts alumni
Year of birth missing (living people)
Grammy Award winners
Record producers from Los Angeles